Leuluai is a Samoan surname. Notable people with the surname include:

James Leuluai (born 1957), New Zealand rugby league player
Kylie Leuluai (born 1978), New Zealand rugby league player
Macgraff Leuluai (born 1990), New Zealand rugby league player
Phillip Leuluai (born 1977), New Zealand-born Samoan international rugby league player
Thomas Leuluai (born 1985), New Zealand rugby league player
Vincent Leuluai (born 1995), Australian rugby league player

Samoan-language surnames